Victoria Lynn Rowell (born May 10, 1959) is an American actress. She began her career as a ballet dancer and model before making her acting debut in the 1987 comedy film Leonard Part 6. In 1990, Rowell joined the cast of the CBS daytime soap opera The Young and the Restless as Drucilla Winters, her signature and longest role on television, for which she was nominated for three Daytime Emmy Awards. She departed from the show in 2007. Rowell is also well known for her role as Dr. Amanda Bentley in the CBS medical crime drama Diagnosis: Murder (1993–2001). From 1993 to 2000, she appeared on both series simultaneously.

Rowell has had a number of roles in feature films. She starred alongside Eddie Murphy in the 1992 comedy The Distinguished Gentleman, and later had roles in films Dumb and Dumber (1994), Barb Wire (1996) and Eve's Bayou (1997). She is an 11-time NAACP Image Awards winner (for The Young and the Restless).

Early life 
Vicki Lynn Rowell was born in Portland, Maine, on May 10, 1959. Her biological mother, Dorothy Rowell, was of English descent and a Mayflower descendant, and her birth father, whose surname was Wilson, was of Jamaican descent. Rowell knew very little about her father. Dorothy, who suffered from schizophrenia, took a taxi to a hospital to give birth to Rowell, leaving a son and two small daughters unsupervised. When she was 16 days old, Rowell, along with her two sisters, Sheree and Lori, were surrendered to child services.

While living in Maine with foster parents Agatha C. and Robert Armstead, Rowell, then eight, began ballet lessons. She became a member of Sigma Gamma Rho sorority, an African-American Greek-lettered sorority. After dancing with the American Ballet Theater II and the Juilliard School of Music Dance Extension program with Antony Tudor, Rowell accepted guest-artist teaching posts in New England.

Career 
In the 1980s, Rowell became an in-demand runway and catalog model. Rowell made her film debut in the 1987 comedy film Leonard Part 6 opposite Bill Cosby and later had a recurring role on The Cosby Show In 1988, she also had the recurring role of Nella Franklin on the CBS daytime soap opera, As the World Turns.

In 1990, Rowell was cast as street urchin-turned-ballet dancer Drucilla Barber on the CBS daytime soap opera, The Young and the Restless. Rowell became a fan favorite and was nominated for three Daytime Emmy Awards in 1996, 1997, and 1998. She won 11 NAACP Image Awards for her portrayal of Drucilla. Rowell's first run as Drucilla was from 1990 to 1998. She briefly returned in 2000, then returned on a regular basis from 2002 until early 2007. In 2007, Rowell became unhappy with the soap opera behind the scenes, labeling daytime television and The Young and the Restless as racist for not having enough African-American cast and crew. She also argued the directions of her storylines which were not heard, prompting her to leave. Within the storyline, Drucilla fell off a cliff and was presumed dead as her body was never found. Rowell has openly expressed pleasure in returning, and due to the character's strong appeal and popularity, viewers have begged the series to rehire her. However, CBS has stated that having Drucilla return is not the creative decision they are looking for, which has disappointed fans of the actress. In 2014, Rowell posted a series of tweets criticizing the show for not having enough African-Americans in decision-making positions. "Young & Restless on air for 40 years, loyally watched by their absolute competitive-edge audience (blacks) & not one black Exec producer?" – she tweeted. Her tweets coincided with the series' 41st anniversary.

From 1993 to 2001, Rowell starred as Dr. Amanda Bentley in the CBS primetime series Diagnosis: Murder, opposite Dick Van Dyke, replacing Cynthia Gibb from the original made-for-television movie. For much of Rowell's stint on Diagnosis: Murder, she was working on that show and on The Young and the Restless simultaneously. One episode of Diagnosis Murder centered around murder on the set of The Young and the Restless; Rowell was featured as both Amanda and Drucilla in that episode. The series run from 1993 to 2001, producing 178 episodes and two television movies, aired after the series' cancellation. Diagnosis: Murder has also run in syndication as of 1997.

In 1990s, Rowell co-starred in several films. She had the role of Eddie Murphy's character's love interest in the 1992 comedy film, The Distinguished Gentleman. In 1994, she played FBI agent Beth Jordan in comedy film Dumb and Dumber.  She co-starred opposite Mario Van Peebles in the science-fiction crime film Full Eclipse (1993), and had a major role in the box office failure action film Barb Wire (1996) with Pamela Anderson. In 1997 she appeared in the critically acclaimed drama film, Eve's Bayou. In the 2000s, she appeared in the number of small films, such as Motives and A Perfect Fit. In 2006, she co-starred as Samuel L. Jackson's character wife in Home of the Brave. She also had the recurring roles on Single Ladies and Law & Order: Special Victims Unit.

In spring 2009, Rowell signed a six-figure deal with Atria Books for a book about the world of daytime TV. She released her memoirs called The Women Who Raised Me: A Memoir in 2008. She later released Secrets of a Soap Opera Diva: A Novel (2010) The Young and the Ruthless: Back in the Bubbles (2013).

Legal issues 
In February 2015, Rowell filed a lawsuit against CBS, Sony Pictures Television, Bell Dramatic Serial Company, and Bell-Phillip Television Production Inc, alleging racial discrimination and retaliation. In the suit, Rowell alleges that since 2010 she had made several attempts to be re-employed at The Young and the Restless or employed at sister soap, The Bold and the Beautiful, but was repeatedly denied due to her outspokenness regarding the lack of diversity both in front of and behind the cameras at CBS. The same day the suit was filed, CBS released a statement saying that Rowell left the cast of her own initiative, the suit was without merit, and they would vigorously defend the case. In June 2015, Rowell's legal team filed a declaration in furtherance of the lawsuit. In the declaration, Rowell alleges that she was the target of racially motivated attacks on the set of The Young and the Restless, at the hands of former co-stars, Michelle Stafford, Melody Thomas Scott, and Peter Bergman. In November 2015, the judge presiding over the case dismissed the suit without prejudice. Rowell's legal team resubmitted an amended claim that included an allegation against Corday Productions and Sony Pictures Television. Alleging that she pursued a role on the  Sony and Corday produced NBC soap Days of Our Lives, but was removed from the audition list. In June 2016, the judge again dismissed the previous claims against CBS and Bell-Phillip Television Production Inc., allowing Rowell to continue the suit against Corday Productions and Sony Pictures Television. In February 2017, it was reported the case had been settled.

In September 2018, in the wake of Les Moonves' resignation as the chairman and CEO of CBS due to sexual misconduct allegations, Rowell took to her Twitter account to directly accuse Moonves of hindering her career. Partially quoting Moonves' statement denying the accusations that he attempted to damage the careers of certain women, she tweeted: "And I have never used my position to hinder the advancement or careers of women," Moonves responded. #LIAR. Your loafer heel has been on my neck  for over 11 years all because I cited a lack of substantive of diversity at CBS behind the camera #MeToo  #RetaliationIsIllegal  #Bully

Personal life 

Rowell's first marriage was to Tom Fahey in 1989. They had a daughter, Maya, and divorced the following year. Rowell had a long-term relationship with musician Wynton Marsalis; and they had a son, Jasper. In May 2008, Rowell announced her engagement to Radcliffe Bailey, an Atlanta artist, at her annual High Tea at Noon fundraiser. Victoria and Radcliffe married on June 27, 2009, in Dublin, New Hampshire. On January 2, 2014, Bailey filed for divorce from Rowell.

Work with foster children 
In 1990, Rowell founded the "Rowell Foster Children Positive Plan," which gives emotional support and financial aid to foster children, especially to those who aspire to become actors and dancers – the road Rowell took. In 2004, she was a special guest on the talk show Dr. Phil, in which she gave an emancipated foster child a chance at a job with Sony, dental care, and a scholarship from her foundation.

In May 2006, Rowell was awarded an honorary Doctorate of Humane Letters by the University of Southern Maine in recognition of her work for the benefit of foster children. In 2007, Rowell published a memoir of her life that focused on her time in foster care. Entitled The Women Who Raised Me, Rowell discusses all of the foster mothers who cared for her and for her sisters. She also pays tribute to the women in a documentary film, The Mentor, that she participated in.  Rowell says that she began writing the book when Y&R turned down her offer to write for the show. She began a national book tour in April 2007.

In March 2008, Rowell was the first recipient of the Gift of Adoption Celebration of Adoption Award, an award given to individuals or groups who are helping to unite children with adoptive families.

In March 2012, Rowell's book, Tag, Toss & Run: 40 Classic Lawn Games, co-authored with environmental activist Paul Tukey, was released.

Filmography

Film

Television

Awards and nominations

References

External links 
 
 
 Rowell Foster Children Positive Plan
 Gift of Adoption Fund
 TheLoop21.com's interview with Victoria Rowell

1959 births
American film actresses
American soap opera actresses
Living people
American people of English descent
Actresses from Portland, Maine
School of American Ballet alumni
American television actresses
African-American actresses
20th-century American actresses
21st-century American actresses